Prosperity Bancshares, Inc. is a bank holding company headquartered in Houston, Texas with operations in Texas and central Oklahoma. As of December 31, 2019, the company operated 285 branches: 65 in the Houston area, including The Woodlands, Texas; 30 in South Texas, including Corpus Christi, Texas and Victoria, Texas; 75 in the Dallas–Fort Worth metroplex; 22 in East Texas; 29 in Central Texas, including Austin, Texas and San Antonio; 34 in West Texas, including Lubbock, Texas, Midland–Odessa, and Abilene, Texas; 16 in Bryan–College Station; 6 in Central Oklahoma; and 8 in Tulsa, Oklahoma.

History
The company was formed in 1983 to purchase a former Allied Bank branch in Edna, Texas. The Edna bank dated back to 1949 as the First National Bank of Edna.

In November 2008, in a transaction organized by the Federal Deposit Insurance Corporation, the company acquired Franklin Bank, which suffered from bank failure.

In 2010, the company acquired 3 branches in Texas as part of the acquisition of FBOP Corporation by U.S. Bancorp.

In July 2012, the company acquired the 37-branch American State Bank, which provided the company its first locations in West Texas.

In April 2013, the company acquired Coppermark Bank and its 9 branches, including 6 branches in Central Oklahoma, its first presence outside Texas.

In November 2013, the company acquired First Victoria National Bank and its 34 branches.

In April 2014, the company acquired F&M Bancorporation and its 13 branches, including several in Tulsa, Oklahoma.

In November 2019, the company acquired LegacyTexas Bank and its 42 branches.

References

External links
 
 

Holding companies of the United States
Banks based in Texas
Companies based in Houston
American companies established in 1983
Banks established in 1983
Holding companies established in 1983
1983 establishments in Texas
Companies listed on the New York Stock Exchange